Rhinella rumbolli is a species of toad in the family Bufonidae that is found in Argentina and possibly Bolivia. Its natural habitats are temperate forests and rivers. It is threatened by habitat loss.

References

Sources

rumbolli
Amphibians of Argentina
Amphibians described in 1992
Taxonomy articles created by Polbot